Stephen Kendall Gadd (born April 9, 1945) is an American drummer, percussionist, and session musician. Gadd is one of the best-known and highly regarded session and studio drummers in the industry, recognized by his induction into the Modern Drummer Hall of Fame in 1984. Gadd's performances on Paul Simon's "50 Ways to Leave Your Lover" and "Late in the Evening" and Steely Dan's "Aja" are examples of his style. He has worked with other popular musicians from many genres including Simon & Garfunkel, Paul McCartney, James Taylor, Harry Chapin, Joe Cocker, Bonnie Raitt, Grover Washington Jr., Michael Brecker, Chick Corea, Lee Ritenour, Paul Desmond, Kate Bush, Chet Baker, Al Di Meola, Chuck Mangione, Kenny Loggins, Eric Clapton, Pino Daniele, Michel Petrucciani, and Toshiki Kadomatsu.

Early life
Gadd grew up in Irondequoit, New York. He started playing the drums at a very early age. At age 11, he entered the Mickey Mouse National Talent Round Up contest and was one of the winners; he won a trip to California, where he met Walt Disney and appeared on The Mickey Mouse Club, where he played the drums and did a tap dancing routine. Gadd graduated from Eastridge High School, then attended the Eastman School of Music, graduating in 1968. He was then drafted into the United States Army, where he served the next three years playing drums in the United States Army Field Band stationed at Ft. Meade, MD.

Career

In 1968, Gadd made his first studio recording on Gap Mangione's album Diana in the Autumn Wind.

In 1973, Gadd formed the short-lived jazz fusion band L'Image with Mike Mainieri, Warren Bernhardt, David Spinozza and Tony Levin. Also in 1973, he started playing on numerous albums for the jazz label CTI Records, backing artists like Milt Jackson, Chet Baker, Art Farmer, Jim Hall, and Hubert Laws. Gadd played drums on the title track of Steely Dan's 1977 jazz-rock album Aja; the drum solo he played at the end of the song has become "the stuff of legend", according to a 2019 Jazziz article, with its "explosive tom-tom runs and crisp cymbal grooves". Other notable recordings from the 1970s are Van McCoy's hit "The Hustle" (1975), Paul Simon's "50 Ways To Leave Your Lover" (1975), Rickie Lee Jones' "Chuck E.'s in Love" (1979) and the Chick Corea albums "The Leprechaun" (1976), "My Spanish Heart" (1976), "The Mad Hatter" (1978), and "Friends" (1978).

In 1981, he played drums and percussion for Simon and Garfunkel's Concert in Central Park.

Gadd was a member of the Manhattan Jazz Quintet from its founding in 1983 until he left in 1987, replaced by Dave Weckl, although he has reunited with the group several times since then. The group has only officially released its albums in Japan, and is best known there.

Gadd toured the entire year of 1991 with Paul Simon. He recorded and toured with Eric Clapton in 1994/1996 and again from 1997 to 2004. 1997 also saw him on a world tour in a trio with the French jazz great Michel Petrucciani and his long-time band colleague, bassist Anthony Jackson (captured on the Trio in Tokyo live album). Gadd played on the blues album Riding with the King along with B. B. King, Eric Clapton, Jimmie Vaughan and a few others. In 2009, Gadd returned to Clapton's band to play 11 nights at the Royal Albert Hall and was part of Clapton's touring band throughout May 2009. Also in 2009, Gadd reunited with L'Image, and the group performed at the Iridium Jazz Club in New York City, toured Japan and Europe, and released the album L'Image 2.0.

Gadd toured in 2014 with James Taylor. Since 2014, Gadd has played in a soul-jazz trio "Blicher Hemmer Gadd" with Danish 4 times Danish Grammy winner Michael Blicher (saxophone) and Dan Hemmer (Hammond Organ). Blicher Hemmer Gadd has released 4 albums.

Gadd has also worked with Chet Baker, Tony Banks, Jon Bon Jovi, Bee Gees, George Benson, Edie Brickell, Kate Bush, Stanley Clarke, Eric Clapton, Joe Cocker, Chick Corea, Jim Croce, Christopher Cross, Pino Daniele, Paul Desmond, Al Di Meola, Art Farmer, Roberta Flack, Aretha Franklin, Eddie Gómez, Dave Grusin, Bob James, Al Jarreau, Quincy Jones, Rickie Lee Jones, The Manhattan Transfer, Paul McCartney, Ringo Starr, Michael McDonald, Michel Petrucciani, Bonnie Raitt, Return to Forever, Diana Ross, David Sanborn, Carly Simon, Chuck Mangione, Paul Simon, Frank Sinatra, Phoebe Snow, Steps Ahead, Barbra Streisand, Stuff, Richard Tee, Michal Urbaniak, and Dionne Warwick.

Gadd has written a book about the rudiments of drumming entitled Gaddiments, which was released on Hudson Music in 2021.

Influences
Gadd's influences included Buddy Rich, Elvin Jones, Tony Williams, and the "less is more" style of Rick Marotta.

Equipment
Gadd endorses and uses Yamaha drums, pedals and hardware, Zildjian cymbals, Remo drumheads, Latin Percussion, Earthworks microphones, Vic Firth sticks and brushes and Beato bags.

Gadd uses the Steve Gadd Commemorative kit, which Yamaha made for the 30th anniversary of his collaboration with the company. The kit consists of a 22"×14" maple bass drum and 12"x8", 13"x9", 14"x12" and 16"x14" birch tom toms. He uses his 14"x5.5" Yamaha Steve Gadd signature steel snare drum with wood hoops, which also comes in birch and maple versions, and he has started to endorse the newer Yamaha Recording Custom series.

Gadd has also used a Yamaha Club Custom drum kit in a blue swirl finish.

Gadd also has Vic Firth sticks with his signature on them. The drumsticks are very light and thin, black in color, and have normal "wood color" on the tips. There is also an identical model with nylon tips. The stick is slightly shorter than the American Classic 5A, and features a barrel tip for improved recording sound. In addition to having his own signature stick, he has his own signature brushes. These brushes are intended to solve the problem of wire brushes snagging on new coated drumheads by slightly angling the wires in the top 3/4 inches (1.9 cm) of the playing end. The wires glide across the head, allowing a smoother sweep and a velvet swish sound.

Gadd uses a variety of Remo heads: a Coated Powerstroke 3 on the batter side of the snare with a Hazy Diplomat on the resonant side of the snare, Clear Pinstripes or Coated Ambassadors on the batter sides of toms, and Clear Ambassadors for the resonant sides. He is using a Coated Powerstroke 3 both on his snare and kick drum.

He also has an LP Steve Gadd signature cowbell, modelled on the LP Mambo cowbell that he has used since the 1970s.

According to Allmusic, Gadd has been credited with playing surdo, kalimba, timpani, tambourine, congas, Grand Cassa, bongos, timbales, snare drum, cymbals and palmas in addition to a drum kit.

Awards and honors
 Honorary Doctor of Music degree, Berklee College of Music, 2005
 Grammy Award nomination, Best Contemporary Instrumental Album, Way Back Home, 2017
 Grammy Award, Best Contemporary Instrumental Album, Steve Gadd Band, 2018

 Blicher Hemmer Gadd : Danish Grammy Award nomination, Best Instrumental Jazz Album, Omara, 2017

Discography

As leader 
 Gaddabout (Electric Bird, 1984)
 The Boys from Rochester with Chuck Mangione (Feels So Good, 1989)
 Together Forever with Chuck Mangione (Gates Music, 1994)
 Trio in Tokyo with Michel Petrucciani (Dreyfus, 1999)
 Steps/Smokin' in the Pit (NYC, 1999)
 Super Trio with Chick Corea, Christian McBride (Mad Hatter, 2006)
 Live at Voce (BFM, 2010)
 Gadditude (BFM, 2013)
 Blicher Hemmer Gadd (C-Nut, 2014)
 70 Strong (BFM, 2015)
 Way Back Home (BFM, 2016)
 Chinese Butterfly with Chick Corea (Stretch, 2017)
 Steve Gadd Band (BFM, 2018)

With Manhattan Jazz Quintet
 Autumn Leaves (Paddle Wheel, 1985)
 Live at Pit Inn (Paddle Wheel, 1986)
 The Sidewinder (Paddle Wheel, 1986)
 My Funny Valentine (Paddle Wheel, 1986)
 Live at Pit Inn Vol. 2 (Paddle Wheel, 1986)
 My Favorite Things: Live in Tokyo (Paddle Wheel, 1987)
 Manhattan Blues (Sweet Basil, 1990)
 Concierto De Aranjuez (Sweet Basil, 1994)
 V.S.O.P. (Birds, 2008)
With Blicher Hemmer Gadd
 Blicher Hemmer Gadd (c-nut records, 2014)
 Omara (c-nut records, 2018)
 Get That Motor Runnin´ (c-nut records, 2019)
 It will be alright (c-nut records, 2023)

References

External links

 Official site
 Steve Gadd 2014 Interview - with Rochester magazine POST
 Steve Gadd at BehindTheDrums – contains discography and equipment list.
 Steve Gadd at Drummerworld – contains video and sound clips.
 Steve Gadd at OnlineDrummer – contains video clips.
 Steve Gadd 2015 Interview NAMM Oral History Library
 Official site for Blicher Hemmer Gadd www.BlicherHemmerGadd.com

1945 births
People from Irondequoit, New York
20th-century American drummers
American blues drummers
American jazz drummers
American jazz musicians
American male drummers
American people of Italian descent
American rock drummers
American session musicians
Bongo players
Conga players
Eastman School of Music alumni
Grammy Award winners
Jazz fusion drummers
Jazz musicians from New York (state)
Living people
American male jazz musicians
Manhattan Jazz Quintet members
Manhattan School of Music alumni
Return to Forever members
Rhythm and blues drummers
Soul drummers
Steps Ahead members
Stuff (band) members
Tambourine players
Timbaleros
Timpanists
United States Army Band musicians
White Elephant Orchestra members
20th-century American male musicians